Eric Aldwin Bellinger Jr. (born March 26, 1986) is an American singer, songwriter, and record producer from Los Angeles. He began songwriting in 2010, and his co-writing credits including  "Lemme See" by Usher, "New Flame" by Chris Brown, "You Don't Know" by Tank, "Right Here" by Justin Bieber, and "Disrespectful" by Trey Songz. In 2011, Bellinger won a Grammy in the category of Best R&B Album for contribution to Chris Brown's album F.A.M.E.. In 2014, Bellinger renewed focus on his recording career and released his debut album, The Rebirth in February of that year. He then released two extended plays with 300 Entertainment, Eric B for President: Term 1 in 2016, and Eric B for President: Term 2 in 2017.

Early life 
Bellinger grew up in Los Angeles, California, but attended schools in the Norwalk/Santa Fe Springs area, where he met his future manager Nieman Johnson. Bellinger is the grandson of Jackson 5 songwriter Bobby Day.

Career

The Writing Camp and early career 
Bellinger had earned a football scholarship to University of Southern California, but rejected the offer to record and tour with R&B group AKNU. The group was signed to Epic Records by executives Max Gousse and Tommy Mottola, and in 2010 he was invited to work with songwriting collective The Writing Camp by childhood friend and mentor Erika Nuri. Bellinger first co-wrote for pop acts such as Selena Gomez and the Scene, Jacob Latimore, and Big Time Rush, until 2012 when he contributed to the song "Death Penalty" on Los Angeles rapper The Game's mixtape California Republic. Bellinger's connection with The Game led to him writing and featuring on several songs off The Game's album The Documentary 2, for which he received greater recognition and signed a publishing deal with Sony ATV. However, complications with Bellinger's songwriting catalogue caused him to leave Sony ATV to sign with publisher BMI.

Solo career and The Rebirth 
In 2013, Bellinger released a three-part series of mixtapes: Born II Sing Vol. 1, Born II Sing Vol. 2, and Born II Sing Vol. 3. Bellinger released his debut studio album, The Rebirth, on May 17, 2014, as a double album. The Rebirth peaked at 23 on the US R&B/Hip Hop charts, and 15 on the US R&B chart, and also entered the Heatseakers Albums chart.

Bellinger followed The Rebirth with the studio albums, Cuffing Season and Cuffing Season, Part 2, which released in July 2015 and December 2015, respectively. Cuffing Season peaked at 6 on the US R&B chart, while Cuffing Season, Part 2 peaked at 23.

Bellinger released two mixtapes in the spring of 2016, Choose Up Season and Eventually. Choose Up Season featured the song "Valet" featuring Fetty Wap and 2 Chainz.

Between 2016 and 2017, Bellinger released three extended plays as part of the Eric B. for President series, the title referencing the Eric B & Rakim song "Eric B. Is President". The Eric B. for President series featured two full-instrumental extended plays: Eric B for President: Term 1, released on September 9, 2016, an acoustic remake of the EP titled Term 1, titled Eric B for President: Term 1 (Acoustic), released on January 20, 2017, and Eric B for President: Term 2, released on March 10, 2017. G.O.A.T. (combiner two version) and Drive By Certifications Gold from RIAA.

On April 6, 2018, Bellinger released the album Eazy Call. One month later, while on his Eazy Call Tour, Bellinger released a 5-track EP, Meditation Music, to commemorate National Meditation Day (May 21). This project was inspired by yoga and meditation which he claimed changed his life for the better. The 5 tracks ("Meditate", "Frequency" (ft. Blaq Tuxedo), "Chakras", "Hours" and "Massage") were later joined into a single 20min track titled after the EP name, Meditation Music.

On September 10, 2021, Bellinger released New Light, the album which earned him his first Grammy nomination as an artist: Best Progressive R&B Album. In May 2022, Bellinger announced his publishing deal with Roc Nation. It was also announced that he performs the theme song of the Sesame Street spinoff series Mecha Builders, alongside Shanice.

Awards 
As a songwriter

In 2011, Bellinger won a Grammy in the category of Best R&B Album for his work on F.A.M.E. by Chris Brown (he wrote "She Ain't You" and Say It with Me").

As a songwriter, he was nominated three other times for a Grammy: two nominations for Best Urban Contemporary Album (Fortunate and X by Chris Brown) and one nomination for Best R&B Song (for "New Flame" from X by Chris Brown).

In 2013, Bellinger co-wrote "Lemme See" by Usher, which was named an ASCAP Award Winning R&B/Hip-Hop Song.

As an artist

As an artist, Bellinger's album "New Light" (2021) received a nomination for Best Progressive R&B Album at the 64th Annual Grammy Awards.

Personal life 
Bellinger married La'Myia Good on January 1, 2015. Bellinger and Good met in the early 2000s in Los Angeles, where both were working on music with the same manager before losing contact for a few years, they re-connected later. Bellinger and Good have 2 sons, Elysha and Eazy Bellinger. Bellinger is the brother-in-law of Meagan Good.

Discography

Studio albums

Collaborative albums

Extended plays

Mixtapes

Singles 
 "I Don't Want Her" (2014) 
 "Valet" (2015) 
 "Type a Way" (2019)
"Moist" (2019) 
"Only You" (2021)
"Hit Eazy" (2021)

Songwriting credits

Guest appearances 
2011
"Whatever" (with Ashlyne Huff on Let It Out)
2013
"Don't Wanna Fall In Love" (with Lil Rob on "Don't Wanna Fall In Love" single)
2016
"Stay Away" (with E-40 on The D-Boy Diary: Book 1)
2017
"Welcome to My City" (with Ai & Junior Reid on Wa to Yo)
2020:
"How I Feel" (with T.I. and Killer Mike on The L.I.B.R.A.)
2021:
"Over the Moon" (with Oso)
"Bet" (with Kristinia DeBarge)
"Filet Mignon" (with Jim Jones)
"Single & Happy" (with Kash Doll & Wale)
"World Is One" (with Chuu and Kim Yo-han)
"Energy" (with VEDO on 1320)
"On My Way" (with DJ Era, O.T. Genasis & AD)

Notes

References

External links 

 

1984 births
Living people
African-American record producers
Record producers from California
African-American  male singer-songwriters
Singer-songwriters from California
Grammy Award winners
American hip hop singers
American pop musicians
21st-century African-American male singers